The Omnibus Budget Reconciliation Act of 1981 is the federal budget enacted by the 97th United States Congress and signed into law by U.S. President Ronald Reagan. The bill established federal expenditures for fiscal year 1982, which ran from 1 October 1981 through 30 September 1982. The budget bill was the spending counterpart to the revenue bill, the Economic Recovery Tax Act of 1981. The two bills progressed through Congress and were signed by the President together.

Ronald Reagan was elected on his platform of reducing overall federal spending while increasing spending on the military, cutting taxes and balancing the budget. The OBRA cut the federal budget by $36 billion in FY1982 and a cumulative $140 billion including the out years 1983 and 1984. Military spending was raised from $176 billion in FY1981 to $221 billion in FY1982. The Economic Recovery Tax Act was one of the largest tax cuts in US history. The and ERTA and the Tax Reform Act of 1986 are together known as the Reagan tax cuts. The tax and spending cuts comprised what some contemporaries described as Reaganomics and the "Reagan Revolution". The Omnibus Budget Reconciliation Act of 1981 was remarkable for Congress's use of the Reconciliation process.

References

Works cited

See also
Economic Recovery Tax Act of 1981
Tax Equity and Fiscal Responsibility Act of 1982
Domestic policy of the Ronald Reagan administration
97th United States Congress
Congressional Budget and Impoundment Control Act of 1974
Reconciliation (United States Congress)

External links
 Omnibus Budget Reconciliation Act of 1981 (PDF/details) as amended in the GPO Statute Compilations collection

1981 in law
Presidency of Ronald Reagan
1981 in economics
97th United States Congress
Acts of the 97th United States Congress
United States federal reconciliation legislation